Peter H. Buschang (born 1951) is an anthropologist, an orthodontic researcher and an orthodontic educator. He is also an honorary member of American Association of Orthodontics and Edward H. Angle Society of Orthodontists.

Life

Buschang graduated Phi Beta Kappa and received his bachelor's degree in physical anthropology in 1976 from the University of Texas at Austin, followed by his master's degree in primate anatomy in 1978. In 1980, he obtained his PhD in physical anthropology, also from the University of Texas at Austin. He then spent three years as a NIDCR postdoctoral fellow at University of Connecticut School of Dental Medicine, Department of Orthodontics, followed by five years at Université de Montréal's Human Growth Research Center. In 1988, he joined Texas A&M University Baylor College of Dentistry, where he currently serves as a Regents Professor and director of the orthodontic research program.

Orthodontics
Buschang's research interests focus on craniofacial growth, developmental adaptations to orthodontic and surgical treatments, and oral-motor function. He has published over 256 scientific papers  and has given more than 130 invited lectures and workshops. There is a Peter H. Buschang Endowed Professorship in Orthodontic in his name at the Texas A&M University Baylor College of Dentistry. He's also written two textbooks, entitled Clinical Research Methodology and Design for Dentists: Practical Guidelines and Applications  and Recognizing and Correcting Developing Malocclusions: A Problem-Oriented Approach to Orthodontics.

Awards & positions
 Earle E. and Wilma Shepard Award 
 American Association of Orthodontists – honorary member
 Edward H. Angle Society of Orthodontics – honorary member
 Director of Orthodontic Research at Department of Orthodontics, Baylor College of Dentistry – 1989–present
 Regents Professor, Baylor College of Dentistry, 2012–present

References

American dentists
Orthodontists
1951 births
Living people